The Trinity and Mystic Pietà is an oil on oak painting produced in 1512 by German artist Hans Baldung.

Painting
The painting shows God the Father supporting his son, Jesus, with the Holy Spirit above them, represented by a dove; the Trinity is joined by the weeping figures of the Virgin Mary and St. John. The inclusion of God supporting his crucified son within the picture was popular during the late fourteenth and early fifteenth centuries, but is otherwise rare in art history. Beneath the holy figures are a series of smaller individuals, who are assumed by art historians to be the family who commissioned the painting; this is likely to be the Bettschold and Rothschild families, given the coats of arms present in the lower corners. The donors were often depicted during the Middle Ages as much smaller than the holy figures, in order to emphasise the difference between them.

The painting was acquired in 1894 by the National Gallery, London, who still hold the piece as of 2015. The gallery considers that "Baldung's painting invites our imaginative participation by stressing the human emotions of the mourners, and presenting even God the Father simply as a grieving parent."

References

Sources

 

1512 paintings
Paintings by Hans Baldung
Paintings depicting the Holy Trinity
Paintings depicting Jesus
Paintings of the Virgin Mary
Birds in art
Paintings of gods
Collections of the National Gallery, London